Kent Nelson (born 1943) is an American short story writer and poet. He holds a JD from Harvard Law School. His 2014 collection The Spirit Bird won the Drue Heinz Literature Prize. Earlier in his literary career, he was awarded a fellowship by the National Endowment for the Arts.

Selected bibliography

References

Sources 
 

1943 births
Living people
Harvard Law School alumni
American short story writers
American male poets
American male short story writers
20th-century American poets
20th-century American male writers
American nature writers
American male non-fiction writers